Suhail Sharma (born 10 October 1981) is an Indian former cricketer. He played two first-class matches for Delhi between 2006 and 2007.

See also
 List of Delhi cricketers

References

External links
 

1981 births
Living people
Indian cricketers
Delhi cricketers
Cricketers from Delhi